Tibanica is a wetland, part of the Wetlands of Bogotá, located on the border of the locality Bosa, Bogotá and Soacha, Cundinamarca, Colombia. Tibanica is located in the Tunjuelo River basin.

Etymology 
The name Tibanica has its origin in Muysccubun, the language of the Muisca Confederation, the former country on the Altiplano Cundiboyacense before the Spanish conquest. Tiba means "lord", niki; "gate, altar" and ica or icu refers to the supreme being in the Muisca religion, Chiminigagua or the afterlife. The accepted meaning is thus "portal of the altars"; the entrance to a sacred place for the indigenous Muisca.

Flora and fauna

Flora 
Flora registered in Tibanica are among others Senna viarum, Humboldt's willow (Salix humboldtiana), common duckweed (Lemna minor), common cattail (Typha latifolia), and Juncus bogotensis.

Birds 
In Tibanica, 24 bird species have been registered, of which one endemic, uniquely to this wetland, the black-winged kite (Elanus caeruleus).

Other bird species as the Bogotá rail (Rallus semiplumbeus), spot-flanked gallinule (Gallinula melanops bogotensis), and Apolinar's wren (Cistothorus apolinari), named after Colombian monk and ornithologist Apolinar María, have been spotted in Tibanica.

See also 

Biodiversity of Colombia, Bogotá savanna, Thomas van der Hammen Natural Reserve
Wetlands of Bogotá

References

Bibliography

External links 
  Fundación Humedales de Bogotá
  Conozca los 15 humedales de Bogotá - El Tiempo

Wetlands of Bogotá
Geography of Cundinamarca Department
Muysccubun